Aaron Herrera may refer to:

Aaron Herrera (soccer) (born 1997), American soccer player
Aaron Herrera (boxer) (born 1990), Mexican boxer